Upper Yiu Tung is one of the 35 constituencies in the Eastern District.

The constituency returns one district councillor to the Eastern District Council, with an election every four years. The seat is currently held by Chow Cheuk-ki.

Upper Yiu Tung has estimated population of 13,149.

Councillors represented

Election results

2010s

References

Shau Kei Wan
Constituencies of Hong Kong
Constituencies of Eastern District Council
1999 establishments in Hong Kong
Constituencies established in 1999